The 2015 SEC Championship Game was played on Saturday, December 5, 2015 in the Georgia Dome in Atlanta, and determined the 2015 football champion of the Southeastern Conference (SEC). The game was played between the East Division champion Florida Gators and West Division champion Alabama Crimson Tide. Alabama was the designated home team. CBS televised the game for the fifteenth consecutive year.

See also
 Alabama–Florida football rivalry

Notes
The winner of the SEC Championship Game had gone on to compete for a national championship each of the last nine years. The SEC went 7–2 in the final eight BCS Championship games (in 2011 Alabama defeated LSU in a controversial pairing that ultimately helped bring about the playoff system instantiated for the 2014 season).

This is the eighth time Florida and Alabama have faced each other in the championship game, but the first since 2009, which was the last time Florida competed in the SEC Championship Game.

Teams

Florida

The Gators got off to an unexpected 6–0 start after entering their first four games unranked in the AP Poll.  Their fourth victory was a thrilling 28–27 come-from-behind victory over Tennessee as Will Grier completed a pass on 4th-and-13 to Antonio Callaway for a 63-yard touchdown, and Tennessee could not respond as they missed a 55-yard field goal attempt as time expired.  The Gators' next victory came over the no. 3 Ole Miss Rebels 38–10.  Florida would travel to Baton Rouge to face the LSU Tigers without Will Grier, who had been suspended for the remainder of the season that week due to testing positive for performance-enhancing drugs.  Treon Harris started in his place, and the Gators narrowly lost, 28–35.  The Gators rebounded after a bye week with a 27–3 victory over rival Georgia.  The following game against Vanderbilt saw low offensive production, as the Gators won 9–7, clinching the Eastern Division title.  The offense would struggle for the rest of the season, needing overtime to overcome the Florida Atlantic Owls and not scoring at all against rival Florida State in a 2–27 loss.

Alabama

The Crimson Tide would get off to a 2–0 start before losing to no. 15 Ole Miss for the second straight year 37–43.  Alabama never faltered the rest of the season, winning eight of their last nine games by double digits, including over no. 2 and undefeated LSU, a game where Derrick Henry ran for 210 yards, while the defense held Heisman candidate Leonard Fournette to only 31.  The Tide were able to clinch the Western Division title with their 29–13 victory over rival Auburn.

Game summary

Source:

Statistics

References

Championship Game
SEC Championship Game
Alabama Crimson Tide football games
Florida Gators football games
SEC Championship Game
SEC Championship Game
SEC Championship Game